Dying to Live is the first full-length studio album by Joel Hoekstra's 13. It was released on October 16, 2015 by Frontiers Records.

American guitarist Joel Hoekstra is known as a member of the band Whitesnake and for being a former member of Night Ranger. He also contributed to the works of Trans-Siberian Orchestra and to the Broadway musical Rock of Ages. The album was originally announced as a collaboration of Hoekstra with vocalist Russell Allen (Symphony X, Adrenaline Mob) on lead vocals, Vinny Appice (ex-Dio and ex-Black Sabbath) on drums and Tony Franklin (ex-Blue Murder, The Firm and ex-Whitesnake) on bass, with vocalist Jeff Scott Soto (of Talisman, W.E.T., Takara, Yngwie Malmsteen's Rising Force, Humanimal, Soul SirkUS, Axel Rudi Pell and Trans-Siberian Orchestra fame) on backing vocals. Later, Joel Hoekstra decided to record more tracks with Soto on lead vocals and add keyboard player Derek Sherinian to record a few solos.

The album also features guest appearances by Toby Hitchcock (Pride of Lions) and Chloe Lowery (Trans-Siberian Orchestra).

Track listing
All music and lyrics written by Joel Hoekstra, except Changes, lyrics by Russell Allen

Personnel
 Joel Hoekstra - guitar, backing vocals
 Russell Allen (Symphony X, Adrenaline Mob, Allen-Lande, Trans-Siberian Orchestra) - lead and backing vocals
 Jeff Scott Soto (Talisman, W.E.T., ex-Yngwie Malmsteen, Trans-Siberian Orchestra) - lead and backing vocals
 Vinny Appice (ex-Dio, ex-Heaven & Hell, ex-Black Sabbath) - drums
 Tony Franklin (ex-Blue Murder, ex-The Firm, ex-Whitesnake) - bass

Guest musicians

 Toby Hitchcock (Pride of Lions) - lead and backing vocals on track 5, backing vocals on track 8
 Chloe Lowery (Trans-Siberian Orchestra) - lead vocals on track 11
 Derek Sherinian (Black Country Communion, Planet X, ex-Dream Theater, ex-Yngwie Malmsteen) - keyboards
 Charlie Zeleny - percussion
 Dave Eggar – cello

References

2015 debut albums
Frontiers Records albums